This is a list of the National Register of Historic Places listings in Marion County, Texas.

This is intended to be a complete list of properties and districts listed on the National Register of Historic Places in Marion County, Texas. There are one district and 17 individual properties listed on the National Register in the county. Sixteen individually listed properties are Recorded Texas Historic Landmarks while the district contains many more including one that is a State Antiquities Landmark.

Current listings

The locations of National Register properties and districts may be seen in a mapping service provided.

|}

See also

National Register of Historic Places listings in Texas
Recorded Texas Historic Landmarks in Marion County

References

External links

Registered Historic Places
Marion County
Buildings and structures in Marion County, Texas